The Syracuse City School District is a public school district serving students in pre-kindergarten through twelfth grade from Syracuse, New York. Syracuse City Schools enrolls 20,000 students in over thirty primary and secondary school buildings. The school district is run by a board of education that sets school policy and approves school spending. Having the designation of a city school district, the district's budget is a sub-item in Syracuse, New York's municipal budget. The board hires a superintendent under contract to carry out its policies.

Schools

High schools
Corcoran High School
George Fowler High School
Henninger High School
Institute of Technology at Syracuse Central
Nottingham High School

Middle schools (6-8)
Clary Middle School
Danforth Middle School
Expeditionary Learning Middle School
Grant Middle School
Lincoln Middle School
Westside Academy at Blodgett Middle School
Bellevue Middle School Academy (Now closed)
Levy Middle School (Now closed but has recently housed two schools)

Elementary schools (K-5)
Bellevue Elementary School
Delaware Elementary School (Currently being phased out)
Dr. King Magnet School
Dr. Weeks School
Franklin Magnet School
Hughes Magnet School (Currently being phased out into Syracuse Latin)
LeMoyne Elementary School
McKinley-Brighton Magnet School
Meachem School
Porter Elementary School
Salem Hyde School
Seymour Dual Language Academy
VanDuyn School
Webster School

K-8 schools
Aria S. Huntington School
Edward Smith School
Frazer School 
H.W. Smith School
Roberts School
Frank C. McCarthy School (Closed)

Alternative schools
Elmcrest School
Syracuse Renaissance Academy at Carnegie
William R. Beard School

Other campuses
Central Technical Vocational Center
Early Childhood Program
Johnson Center

Say Yes to Education

The Syracuse Say Yes to Education and Economic Development program is a district-wide collaboration between Say Yes, Syracuse University, and the Syracuse City School District aimed at bridging the achievement gap between urban and suburban children by focusing on academic, social-emotional, health, and financial obstacles facing low-income students. The following support systems are offered through the Syracuse Say Yes to Education program: annual and regularly reviewed individual student growth plans; tutoring; identification of strengths and weaknesses through student diagnostic testing; inclusive settings, curriculum, and support for students with disabilities and English language learners; after-school and summer school programs; counseling and family engagement; research-based academic programs such as International Baccalaureate often found in suburban schools; financial aid and college selection counseling; and mentoring.

The Syracuse Higher Education Compact is a partnership between private and public institutions to "collectively provide the opportunity for Say Yes graduates in the city of Syracuse to attend college with tuition, fees, and books paid for."  As of February 2018, more than 100 colleges and universities were promising Syracuse City School District students free college tuition.

Bibliography
Smith, Edward. 1893. A History of the Schools of Syracuse from its Early Settlement to January 1, 1893. Syracuse: C.W. Bardeen, p. 330. Available at Google Books
Hope and Despair in the American City - Which compares the schools in Syracuse to those of the Wake County Public School System of Raleigh, North Carolina

References

External links

 
School districts established in 1848
School districts in New York (state)
1848 establishments in New York (state)